ASM Tofazzal Hossain (died on 12 October 2010; known by his stage name Challenger) was a Bangladeshi television and film actor.

Career
Hossain was nicknamed "Challenger" by writer, director Humayun Ahmed, when he debuted his acting career in the television drama Hablonger Bazare.

Works

Television dramas
{{columns-list|colwidth=15em|
 Hablong-er Bazare (2000)
 Onath Babur Bhoy (2009)
 Brikkho Manab
 Bhober Haat
 Shawkat Shaheber Gari Kena
 Jamunar Jol Dekhtey Kalo
 Gani Shaheber Shesh Kichhudin
 Lilaboti
 Juta Baba
 Salek Dofadar
 Warrant
 Khela
 Dholbatti
 Aj Jorir Biye
 Khuab Nagar
 Chor
 Rupali Ratri
 Pichas Maqbul
 Poddo
 Akti Aoulokkik Bhromon Kahini
 Jol Torongo
 Ai Borshay
 Jinda Kobor
 Aziz Shahed er Pap"
 24 Caret Man Guest appearance 
 Tara Tin Jon}}

Drama serials
 Chandra Karigor Kala Koitor Ure Jay Bok Pokkhi Aim in LifeFilms
 Shyamol Chhaya (2004)
 Noy Number Bipod Sanket Daruchini Dwip (2007)
 Lal Shobuj Kaal Shokaley''

Personal life
Actress Monira Mithu is Challenger's younger sister.

References

External links
 

2010 deaths
Bangladeshi male film actors
Bangladeshi male television actors
20th-century Bangladeshi male actors
21st-century Bangladeshi male actors